Chris Dyment (born October 24, 1979) is an American professional ice hockey player who last played for the Trenton Devils. He was drafted into the National Hockey League by the Montreal Canadiens in the 1999 NHL Entry Draft, 97th overall. He spent his junior career with Boston University.

Career statistics

Awards and honors

References

External links

Living people
Montreal Canadiens draft picks
Boston University Terriers men's ice hockey players
Houston Aeros (1994–2013) players
Springfield Falcons players
Providence Bruins players
Albany River Rats players
Florida Everblades players
SG Cortina players
Trenton Devils players
1979 births
American men's ice hockey defensemen
AHCA Division I men's ice hockey All-Americans